Love Generation may refer to:

 "Love Generation" (song), a song by Bob Sinclar
 Love Generation (EP), a 2017 EP by DIA
 Love Generation (TV series), a Japanese television series
 Former name of Swedish pop group Stockholm Syndrome
 The Love Generation, an American Pop-Rock group from the 1960s

See also
 Sexual revolution
 "Generation Love", a 2011 song by Jennette McCurdy